Lorenzo Ginori Lisci (23 May 1823 – 13 February 1878) was an Italian politician. He was born in Florence. He was mayor of his hometown.

See also
 List of Italians

References

1823 births
1878 deaths
19th-century Italian politicians
Mayors of Florence